Rich Priske (August 29, 1967 July 11, 2020), also known as Rich Rock, was a Canadian bass guitarist. Born in Vancouver, British Columbia, he had long been active in the B.C. music scene, and played bass guitar and/or written songs for Art Bergmann, DSK, ShoCore, Chrome Dog, Bif Naked, The Real McKenzies, and others. Priske was best known for playing bass guitar in the Canadian band Matthew Good Band from 1998 to 2002. After the band's dissolution in 2002, he kept playing with Matthew Good until the end of the In a Coma tour in fall 2005. Later in life, he lived in Kelowna and played in the Jon Bos Band and Florida Man.

Writing 
Priske was an avid writer, contributing to weblogs as a "citizen journalist" for kitsilano.ca, and others. He contributed many technical and instructional articles to magazines such as CM (Canadian Musician). Priske also wrote for Wine Trails, and other wine-industry publications. He had a long history with the web, and was an early adopter of what is now known as "web logging" or "blogging", beginning with his popular "Notes From The Road" feature on the now defunct Matthew Good Band website, circa 2001. He kept a blog on Blogger, but updated it rarely.

Film work 
Priske was also involved in BC's thriving film and theatre industry, on stage and both in front of and behind the camera. As well as appearing in many music videos, he had bit parts in films like Red Scorpion 2, and Hard Core Logo, and appeared on stage in productions of Cabaret and You Can't Take It with You. Behind the scenes, Priske was active in the Art Department, earning an Emmy nomination for 2008's "Tinman".

Death
On July 11, 2020, Priske died of a heart attack.

Discography 

with Matthew Good Band:

Beautiful Midnight
Loser Anthems
The Audio of Being

with Matthew Good:

Avalanche
White Light Rock & Roll Review
In a Coma

with DSK:
 	
Exploder	
Imploder

with Bif Naked:

Bif Naked
Essentially Naked (greatest hits compilation)

with The Real McKenzies:

Real McKenzies
Clash of the Tartans

with ShoCore:

untitled release (2007)

with Brooke Nolan:

self-titled EP

with The Town Pants:

Weight of Words

Sex With Nixon (1995) Self titled LP

References

External links 

 
 
Brooke Nolan
Bif Naked
DSK

1967 births
2020 deaths
Canadian rock bass guitarists
Canadian bloggers
Canadian magazine writers
Musicians from Vancouver
Canadian alternative rock musicians
Writers from Vancouver